The Tarzan yell or Tarzan's jungle call is the distinctive, ululating yell of the character Tarzan as portrayed by actor Johnny Weissmuller in the films based on the character created by Edgar Rice Burroughs starting with Tarzan the Ape Man (1932). The yell was a creation of the movies based on what Burroughs described in his books as simply "the victory cry of the bull ape."

History and origin
Although the RKO Picture version of the Tarzan yell was putatively that of Weissmuller, different stories exist as to how the Tarzan yell was created. One claim is that a man named Lloyd Thomas Leech was the original voice behind the Metro-Goldwyn-Mayer Tarzan yell. He was an opera singer from the 1940s into the '60s, winning the Chicagoland Music Festival on August 17, 1946, and going on to sing throughout the U.S., touring with several opera companies. There are recordings of his recollections of creating the Tarzan yell, a story supported by his children and grandchildren. According to the newspaper columnist L. M. Boyd (circa 1970), "Blended in with that voice are the growl of a dog, a trill sung by a soprano, a note played on a violin's G string and the howl of a hyena recorded backward." According to Bill Moyers, it was created by combining the recordings of three men: one baritone, one tenor, and one hog caller from Arkansas. Another widely published notion concerns the use of an Austrian yodel played backwards at abnormally fast speed.  But Weissmuller claimed that the yell was actually his own voice. His version is supported by his son and by his Tarzan co-star, Maureen O'Sullivan.

The yell, as used in the 6 MGM films, is a palindrome, it sounds the same when played backwards, indicating some manipulation in the sound editing department. The first part of the sound plays normally but when it reaches the half way point, it becomes the same sound but played in reverse.

Appearances
The sound clip used in the Weissmuller films has also been used for animated series appearances of Filmation's Tarzan and in the 1966 Tarzan television series starring Ron Ely, rather than having the actor providing Tarzan's voice for the series attempt to imitate the trademark yell.  It was also used in the 1981 film Tarzan, the Ape Man, where even the MGM Lion's trademark roar had Tarzan's yell dubbed in its place.  
The yell is heard at Carolina Hurricanes home games.
A comical version of this yell is used by Ray Stevens in his 1969 novelty hit "Gitarzan".
The original version of the 1982 video game Jungle Hunt, Jungle King, features a sample of the yell that plays at the start of the game and after the completion of the third level. This sample was replaced with a musical fanfare after a legal dispute with Burroughs' estate forced Taito, the game's publisher, to strip the game of any cosmetic resemblance to Tarzan. 
Comedian Carol Burnett would do the yell on request during a question and answer weekly session on her comedy sketch series The Carol Burnett Show.  She taught it to herself as a young girl and once taught it to opera singer Beverly Sills.
This sound effect is often used for comic effect in later, unrelated movies, particularly when a character is swinging on vines or doing other "Tarzanesque" things.
A version of the yell appears in the 1983 Star Wars original trilogy film Return of the Jedi as Chewbacca swings on a vine towards an Imperial AT-ST walker on the forest moon of Endor. The yell is also heard in the 2005 prequel trilogy film Star Wars: Episode III – Revenge of the Sith in the Battle of Kashyyyk as Wookiee warriors swing on a vine onto an attacking tank droid.
It also appears in the James Bond film Octopussy from 1983.
In the 1935 Mickey Mouse cartoon, Mickey's Garden, a beetle (voiced by Pinto Colvig) lets out a Tarzan yell and chases after Mickey Mouse and Pluto two times. It is later reused in the 1941 Disney animated feature Dumbo and the 1941 Goofy cartoon The Art of Self Defense.
Donkey Kong has also been known to use the Tarzan yell (although it sounds like "Ooo-wa-ooo-aaooaaooaa-ooo!"). His Tarzan yell is first heard in Donkey Kong: Jungle Beat and later was used in DK Jungle Climber, Donkey Kong Country Returns and later in Donkey Kong Country: Tropical Freeze.
Roronoa Zoro used the  Tarzan yell in One Piece, Episode 159, titled: "Onward Crow: To the Sacrificial Altar" when he swang on a vine.
Jerry Mouse as baby mouseling and Tom Cat as baby kitten used the Tarzan yell in Tom & Jerry Kids, Episode 11, titled: "Cast Away Tom" while saving baby pelican and momma seagull's egg.
 Tarzan used the Tarzan yell in Tarzan II before closing the movie.
Moon used the Tarzan yell in The Ollie & Moon Show, Episode 34 titled: "The Malaysian Butterfly Chase" while Moon and Tua played a game chasing after Ollie's special explorer's hat.

Trademark 
The sound itself is a registered trademark and service mark, owned by Edgar Rice Burroughs, Inc.

Recognition of the trademark's registration within the European Union is uncertain. In late 2007, the Office for Harmonization in the Internal Market (OHIM) determined that attempts by ERB, Inc. to maintain such trademark must fail legally, reasoning that "[w]hat has been filed as a graphic representation is from the outset not capable of serving as a graphic representation of the applied-for sound ... The examiner was therefore correct to refuse the attribution of a filing date." Regardless, the trademark registration was updated in 2010 (to include slot machines) and 2014 (to include online use).

Other Tarzan yells
The first ever version of the yell can be found in the part-sound serial Tarzan the Tiger (1929).  This version is described as a "Nee-Yah!" noise.

In the 1932 Tarzan radio serial with James Pierce, the yell sounds like "Taaar-maan-ganiii". In the ape language mentioned in the Tarzan novels, "Tarmangani" means "White Ape".

A very similar cry was used for Burroughs' own Tarzan film, The New Adventures of Tarzan (1935), shot concurrently with the MGM Weissmuller movies in Central America with Herman Brix as a cultured Tarzan.  The yell can best be described as a "Mmmmm-ann-gann-niii" sound that gradually rises ever higher in pitch.

Elmo Lincoln recreated his victory cry in a 1952 episode of You Asked for It.

Tarzan's yell is used as a melodic refrain in the Baltimora single Tarzan Boy. This refrain plays in place of an ordinary Tarzan yell when Haru climbs and struggles to keep his balance on the top of a palm tree in Beverly Hills Ninja. The refrain was also used in a 1993 jungle-themed advert for Listerine's Cool Mint mouthwash.

In the 1991 TV series Land of the Lost, Christa (played by Shannon Day) used a similar sounding version of the yell that was used to calm certain animals.

In the 1999 Disney animated film Tarzan, the character himself lets out an updated version of his jungle call at various moments. The yell is dubbed by Brian Blessed, who voiced the villain Clayton. This was done after Tony Goldwyn, who voiced the title character, blew his vocals.

Jane (as portrayed by Maureen O'Sullivan) used a variation of the Tarzan yell.

See also
 Wilhelm scream
 Howie scream 
 Goofy holler
 Castle thunder

References

External links
 
 
 The Tarzan Yell. Excerpt from the Documentary: "Tarzan: Silver Screen King of the Jungle"

Tarzan
Sound effects
Sound trademarks
In-jokes
1932 works